Subang National Golf Club (Malay: Kelab Golf Negara Subang) is a golf courses in Kelana Jaya, Selangor, Malaysia and consists of two 18-hole courses. 

It has hosted several significant golf tournaments in its history. It hosted the Malaysian Dunlop Masters several times in the 1970s and 1980s. It also hosted the Malaysian Open in 1983, 1987, and 1991.

In 1977 Walter Godfrey started working as the club pro. He worked at the club for five years. During his tenure at Subang National he won the 1979 Dunlop Masters.

Tournaments hosted 

 1991 Malaysian Open, Asia Golf Circuit event
 1987 Malaysian Open, Asia Golf Circuit event
 1983 Malaysian Open, Asia Golf Circuit event
 1982 Malaysian Dunlop Masters
 1979 Malaysian Dunlop Masters
 1978 Malaysian Dunlop Masters
 1975 Malaysian Dunlop Masters

References

Golf clubs and courses in Malaysia
Petaling Jaya
Sports venues in Selangor